Charles Edward Warburton  (March 2, 1837 – September 1, 1896) was the publisher of the Philadelphia Evening Telegraph with James Barclay Harding.

Biography
He was born on March 2, 1837, in Philadelphia. He started the Philadelphia Evening Telegraph in 1864.

He died on September 1, 1896, in Atlantic City, New Jersey. At his death his son, Barclay Harding Warburton I took over as publisher.

References

1836 births
1896 deaths
Businesspeople from Philadelphia
19th-century American newspaper publishers (people)
19th-century American journalists
Warburton family
American male journalists
19th-century American male writers